Medinah Country Club is a private country club in Medinah, Illinois, with nearly 600 members and  containing three golf courses, Lake Kadijah, swimming facilities, a golf learning center, golf shop, gun club, racket center and a mosque-evoking Byzantine-style, Moroccan domed clubhouse topped with minarets and classic Moorish architectural aspects. Medinah will host the 2026 President’s Cup

Early history
The club was founded in 1924 by the Medinah Shriners (named after an Arabian city) and by the late 1920s had approximately 1,500 golfing and social members. The first golf course was opened in September 1925, followed by Course 2 in 1926, and finally Course 3 in 1928. During the construction of the courses, Richard G. Schmid, a Shriner and charter member of the club, had designed the clubhouse itself The Great Depression brought severe financial hardship and many members left. The club responded by waiving initiation fees, lowering dues, holding fundraising events, and (significantly) hosting professional golf tournaments. Eventually, non-Shriners were allowed to apply for membership. World War II exacerbated the club's financial woes and membership fell far below capacity. Course 2 was closed and members helped with upkeep on the two remaining courses. During the post war era Medinah entered a period of gradual recovery and membership growth. The Duke of York once visited the club and remarked, "I've never seen such a place, it is quite strange, yet attractive."

Golf

Course 3
Medinah has three golf courses in a 54-hole complex. Many noted golf professionals have played Course 3, beginning with "Lighthorse" Harry Cooper at the Medinah Open in 1930. Other noted players include Gene Sarazen, Byron Nelson, Cary Middlecoff, Billy Casper, Gary Player, Hale Irwin and Tiger Woods. Tommy Armour, winner of multiple major championships and the namesake of a well-known golfing equipment brand, was Medinah's head pro for many years. Course 3 hosted the Western Open three times in 1939, 1962, and 1966; it was one of the largest non-major tournaments on the early tour.

Medinah's courses were originally designed by Tom Bendelow. In the 1930 Medinah Open, Lighthorse Harry played the course with a 63 (the lowest score ever shot on the course) in the second round. The junior course record of 68 is jointly held by Russell Katz and Kenny Wittenberg. Medinah's board approved a redesign of the course, subject to the availability of funds and the return of adjacent land to the club by Medinah's four founders. The major redesign was followed by several more changes. Furthermore, Medinah Country Club is noted for the three waterfront par three holes in numbers 2, 13, and 17.

Medinah's Course 3 hosted the BMW Championship on August 15–18, 2019! during which the course record was tied or set four different times. In round 1, both Justin Thomas and Jason Kokrak shot 65, tying the course record previously set by Skip Kendall, Mike Weir and Tiger Woods. On Friday, Hideki Matsuyama broke the record by two shots, shooting a bogey-free 63. In the third round on Saturday, after starting with five consecutive birdies, Thomas shot an 11-under 61, including two eagles, breaking the course record again by two shots.

Tiger Woods
Woods' appearances at Medinah have enhanced the club's international reputation. His first win at the course was the 1999 PGA Championship, his second major and first PGA Championship (and also the first PGA Championship hosted at No. 3), which brought him much media attention. In a contest of highly touted young talent, the then-23-year-old Woods held off a challenge from then-19-year-old Sergio García even after the Spaniard hit a shot on the 16th hole from the base of a tree that seemed to have at least earned him a playoff despite trailing Woods by five shots at one point during the round, but Woods maintained his focus before a raucous crowd and preserved a one-stroke win. In 2006, Woods won by five strokes and became the first to win the PGA Championship twice on the same course. In recognition of this achievement, Woods was made a member of the club.

Major tournaments hosted
All held on Course 3: 

Bolded years are major championships on the PGA Tour.
 (90) denotes the winning margin after a playoff of 18 holes.
 91 Holes denotes a sudden-death playoff was used after the score was tied following the 18-hole playoff.

2012 Ryder Cup

Medinah hosted the Ryder Cup in 2012, its first time in the state of Illinois, and the first U.S. venue outside the eastern time zone since 1971. The full tournament took place between September 25–30 (including pre-match competitions, press conferences and media activities), with the main competition taking place from September 28–30 on Course 3.

Scorecard

Amenities 
The club offers various amenities to its members apart from the three golf courses. As they are a part of the club, each of these are exclusive to club members, However, throughout the year, the club holds various events where guests can be invited by members to experience the club's amenities.

Member Dining areas 
The clubhouse features six different member dining areas featuring food from Executive Chef Michael Ponzio. These include:

 The club dining room, a family style restaurant which features seasonal menu changes
 A member bar
 East and west verandas, outdoor seating areas that overlook one of the practice putting greens
 The Oasis, the most casual setting of the country club, which serves as a bar and a family restaurant
 The Backyard Patio and Grill, a resting spot near the pool and backyard practice putting green

Golf Shop 
The Golf Shop is a 3000 sq. ft. building separate from the main clubhouse. The shop included golf apparel, accessories, and equipment.

Driving Range and Practice Greens 

The driving range includes seven target greens as well as a short game area. The club also has two practice putting greens, one located in the front of the clubhouse, and one in the backyard.

Pool and Cabana Bar 
Located to the southeast side of the clubhouse, the pool features two diving boards, five competitive swim lanes, as well as a deck for seating. Near the poolside is the Cabana bar and a snack bar.

Golf Learning Center 
The golf learning center has three virtual practice bays, a fitness bay, and custom club fitting. The center first opened in the winter of 2017 and is available for members to practice off of the course.

Racket Center 
The racket center has a total of eight tennis courts, four of which are platform courts. The building also features indoor seating arrangements and a firepit.

Membership 
Medinah Country Club offers 5 categories of membership, all of which are by invitation only.

Regular Membership 
Includes full clubhouse access and unlimited access to all three golf courses.

Social Membership 
Includes full clubhouse access and invitations to use the golf courses four times a year. Offered in three age groups: Over 40, 30–39, and under 30.

Associate Membership 
Includes full clubhouse access and unlimited access to all three golf courses. Offered in four age groups: 21–25, 26–29, 30–34, 35–39.

National Membership 
Includes full clubhouse access and full access to the golf courses twelve times a year. To be eligible for this membership category, one's place of residence must be one hundred twenty five miles or more from the club.

International Membership 
Includes full clubhouse access and full access to the golf courses twelve times a year. To be eligible for this membership category, one's place of residence must be outside of the United States.

References

External links
 
 PGATour.com
 Course tour at Ryder Cup

1924 establishments in Illinois
Sports venues in DuPage County, Illinois
Golf clubs and courses designed by A. W. Tillinghast
Golf clubs and courses designed by Tom Bendelow
Golf clubs and courses in Illinois
Medinah, Illinois
Ryder Cup venues
Sports venues completed in 1924